The Chrysler by Chrysler is an automobile produced by Chrysler Australia from 1971 to 1976. It is an extended wheelbase, luxury variant of the Australian developed Chrysler Valiant.

CH Series
The original CH Series Chrysler was introduced in November 1971 replacing the Chrysler VIP as Chrysler’s competitor to the Ford Fairlane and the Statesman in the Australian prestige car market. It was offered in four-door Sedan and two-door Hardtop models. The Chrysler was based on the VH series Chrysler Valiant, utilizing the floorpan of the two-door Hardtop version. The  wheelbase of the Chrysler was identical to that of the Valiant Hardtop and  longer than that used on the Valiant Sedan. The Chrysler also differed significantly from the Valiant in external appearance, featuring a four headlight grille encircled by a chrome surround and a unique wrap-around horizontal tail-light assembly. The frontal styling and wrap-around bumper were similar to the 1969-1971 Chrysler New Yorker. A long list of standard luxury equipment items set the Chrysler further apart from the Valiant and included front disc brakes, power assisted steering, a push button radio with power antenna, a carpeted boot, tinted power operated windows and courtesy lighting which included adjustable reading lights for rear passengers. Considerable attention had also been taken to reduce noise, vibration, and harshness (NVH) with the application of additional soundproofing material.

A  Hemi six-cylinder engine was fitted as standard equipment, with an American designed, Australian built  V8 available as an option. An imported “TorqueFlite” three-speed automatic transmission was used in all variants.

CJ Series

An updated CJ Series version of the Chrysler was released in May 1973, one month after the VJ Series update of the Valiant. This model of the Chrysler was distinguishable by minor cosmetic styling changes from its predecessor. The four-door Sedan was now the only model offered, as the two-door Hardtop body-style was not carried over into this Series.

CK Series
An updated CK Series version of the Chrysler was released in October 1975, coinciding with the release of the VK Valiant range. Changes were again minor. The  V8 engine was modified to improve both economy and performance, however new emission regulations saw this unit replaced by a  V8 from 1 July 1976.

The CK Chrysler was discontinued in October 1976 with the introduction of the CL Series of Valiant and Regal models. This range included a luxury Chrysler Regal SE Sedan which effectively replaced the Chrysler, although it did not feature the longer wheelbase or the unique styling features of the outgoing model.

International markets

South Africa

The Chrysler by Chrysler four-door model was locally built and sold in South Africa as the "Dodge SE" along with other Australian Valiant models. 

New Zealand

New Zealand also imported the Chrysler by Chrysler which was sold alongside other Australian Valiants which were otherwise locally assembled by Todd Motors in Wellington. 

Japan

The VH Valiant Charger and CJ Chrysler by Chrysler were exported to Japan via Mitsubishi. These were not successful due to the winding narrow roads of Japan, and the spiralling fuel costs Japan was experiencing as one of the targeted nations during the 1973 oil crisis.

United Kingdom

Australian Valiants were exported to the United Kingdom from the late 1960s to 1976 including the Chrysler By Chrysler.

See also
 Chrysler Australia
 Chrysler Valiant

References

Notes

Bibliography

 Kenwright, Joe. 1971-73 CH Chrysler by Chrysler 360 Hardtop, Australian Muscle Car, Issue 42, pages 86 to 90.
 

Cars of Australia
Chrysler vehicles
1970s cars